The Grandview Steelers are a junior "B" ice hockey team based in Burnaby, British Columbia, Canada. They are members of the Tom Shaw Conference of the Pacific Junior Hockey League (PJHL). The Steelers play their home games at Burnaby Winter Club. Aldo Bruno is the team's Vice-president and general manager. Stevan Matic is the team's head coach.

The Steelers joined the league in 1967 as an original WCJHL team. In its PJHL history, the team has won the Cyclone Taylor Cup twice, in 1994 and 2008. The Steelers have won the PJHL Championship twice, in 1994 and 2008.

History

The Grandview Junior Hockey Association was formed August 17, 1967 after acceptance into the West Coast Junior Hockey League. The Association was formed "to foster, improve and perpetuate a Junior Hockey Team in east Vancouver for players in that area".

The original name of the team was Rowan’s Grandview Steelers, named after Ed Rowan, owner of Rowan Steel Ltd., who provided financial assistance to the community sponsored team.  From day one, until the 2003-2004 season, the Steelers’ home games were played on the small ice at "Trout Lake Arena" attached to the Grandview Community Centre.  The original colours adopted were black and orange.  The current colours black and gold were adopted in the 1980-1981 season.  They were the colours of that era’s Grandview Minor Hockey Association.  Over many years, the largest percentage of Steelers players came from the Grandview Minor Hockey Association.

Over time, the club found if difficult to remain a contender due to its mandate which was to take players primarily from Grandview while other clubs searched far and wide even to the extent of reaching out of province. There was also the difficulty of increasing operational costs within an era of Jr. B clubs trying to operate more on a Jr. A level while the rink the Steelers were mandated to play in did not accommodate enough fans to help pay the bills.

Louis and Yvonne Szendrei took over the running of the club when in 1980-1981; Louis became President/Governor of the Grandview Steelers.  Prior to that, Louis was President of the Grandview Minor Hockey Association.  Since that time, Louis has noted the foregoing difficulties but despite them, has enjoyed numerous successes that include going all the way. The Steelers were the 1993-1994 Provincial Champions. The Steelers, under coach Aldo Bruno, were the 1999-2000 Provincial Finalists having achieved 2nd place and Aldo was named Coach of the Year that season.

Recognizing that within current times, the Steelers had outgrown Trout Lake, Louis Szendrei moved the team to Britannia Community Centre. The larger ice and much improved fan accommodation improved the spirits of the fans and players. Over time, players would be more eager to come and try out for the Steelers, who it is understood have always had management with a player concern attitude and the best of coaching.

Starting the 2007-2008 season the Steelers changed hands from Louis and Yvonne Szendrei to Mike and Sandy Moscone and Aldo Bruno.  Louis and Yvonne have stayed on as Governor and Alternating Governor, respectively. After many glorious years of exciting hockey in Vancouver East at the Trout Lake and Britannia Arenas, not only did the 2007-2008 season bring new owners but it also brought a permanent change of venue to the Burnaby Winter Club.

The 2007-2008 season would see the Steelers struggle at the beginning but become victorious at the end with the winning of the League Championship (PIJHL) over the ever persistent Abbotsford Pilots. The Steelers arrived in Kimberley and walked away with the Provincial Championship (Cyclone Taylor Cup). The next stop in an already incredible year would be Selkirk, Manitoba for the Western Canadian Finals or Keystone Cup. The Steelers came home with the Bronze.

Season-by-season record

Note: GP = Games played, W = Wins, L = Losses, T = Ties, OTL = Overtime Losses, Pts = Points, GF = Goals for, GA = Goals against

Cyclone Taylor Cup
British Columbia Jr B Provincial Championships

Keystone Cup
Western Canadian Jr. B Championships(Northern Ontario to British Columbia)
Six teams in round robin play. 1st vs 2nd for gold/silver & 3rd vs. 4th for bronze.

Awards and trophies

Cyclone Taylor Cup
2007-08

PIJHL Championship
1993-94, 2007–08

NHL alumni

External links
Official website of the Grandview Steelers
Official website of the Pacific Junior Hockey League

Pacific Junior Hockey League teams
Ice hockey teams in British Columbia
Ice hockey clubs established in 1967 
1967 establishments in British Columbia
Sport in Burnaby